Fred Grossinger (January 1, 1936 – November 21, 1995), better known as Fred Holliday, was an American stage, film, and television actor. He starred in more than one thousand television commercials from the late 1950s through the 1980s.

Career
From the late 1950s to the mid 1990s, Holliday also made guest appearances on more than one hundred and fifty television shows, including Gunsmoke, Ben Casey, Gomer Pyle: USMC, Dragnet, That Girl, The Mod Squad, Nanny and the Professor, Dan August, Ironside, Lassie, Mission:Impossible, Adam-12, The F.B.I., McCloud, Columbo, Eight is Enough, Lou Grant, The Love Boat, Galactica 1980, The Facts of Life, Falcon Crest, Dynasty, Gimme a Break!, Riptide, Matlock, Knots Landing, Jake and the Fatman and Empty Nest. He was one of the Mighty Carson Art Players on NBC's The Tonight Show Starring Johnny Carson for twelve years, performed in the daytime dramas as Ron Wyche in Days of Our Lives, as the manager at the Capwell Hotel in Santa Barbara, in nighttime dramas such as John Atherton in Dallas and was host of a short-lived daytime show, The Girl in My Life, on ABC between 1973 and 1974.  

His movie credits include A Patch of Blue (1965), Airport (1970), Colossus: The Forbin Project (1970), First Family (1980), Edge of the Axe (1988), and Lobster Man from Mars (1989). Holliday appeared in more than fifty Broadway and regional theater productions.

Professionally, Holliday served on the local board of directors of the Los Angeles chapter of AFTRA for ten years, as well as serving on the national board of AFTRA. 

He was also active in the Screen Actors Guild.

Holliday was married to Judy Kapler. He had one daughter, Debra Jeanne (Grossinger) Rouse, from his first marriage to Nancy King.

Death
Holliday died in Los Angeles on November 21, 1995 at the age of fifty-nine. The cause of death was a heart attack.

Filmography

References

External links

Fred Holliday on the Johnny Carson Show Jpeg formatted image file, poor quality

1936 births
1995 deaths
Male actors from Pittsburgh
American male comedians
American male film actors
American game show hosts
American male stage actors
American male television actors
Burials at Mount Sinai Memorial Park Cemetery
20th-century American male actors
20th-century American singers
20th-century American comedians